Jan Hillebrand Wijsmuller (13 February 1855 in Amsterdam – 23 May 1925 in Amsterdam) was a Dutch painter. He belongs to The 2. Golden Age of Dutch Painting.

He is an impressionist of the School of Allebé, better known as Amsterdam Impressionism, part of the international movement of the Impressionism. From the art historical point of view he is one of the 2nd generation of the Hague School. He used the bright color palette of the French Impressionists, too – but from the perspective of a Dutchman.

Life and work

 
From 1876 on Jan Hillebrand Wijsmuller began studying at the Royal Academy of Fine Arts in Amsterdam – better known as Rijksacademie. He had been one of the 179 students of Prof. Allebé – it was well known, that his lessons were based on the current flow of time. In 1877 followed his wandering years. They led him to the Akademie van beeldende Kunsten — Den Haag, the famous Académie royale des Beaux-Arts de Bruxelles and the Hague School in its heyday. – The latter brought forth such famous masters such as Johannes Bosboom, Paul Gabriël, the brothers Jacob Maris and Matthijs Maris, Anton Mauve and Jan Hendrik Weissenbruch. Here, Vincent van Gogh found his way into painting.

He won the Willink van Collenprijs for young artists by which he had been supported. This is awarded annually by the Amsterdam Academy Arti et Amicitiae. In 1883 he had won this award. The name of his work is no longer known.

With his own studio he settled in Amsterdam. His friends included the well known artists Ernst Witkamp, Nicolaas van der Waay and Carel Dake.

He belongs to the second generation of the Hague School. But he was a representative of the Amsterdam Impressionism, better known as School of Allebé, too.

In his creative works the former life of agile, thriving metropolis Amsterdam was immortalized. The opposite pole are landscape portraits. They include scenes canals, windmills and older landscapes with the day's work of fisherman. His repertoire is completed by the classic Dutch theme – the continuation of the tradition of the coastal landscape of the North Sea. He also made portraits of the people of The Hague and surroundings.

He was a representative of the realism and the plein air painting. In his paintings he combines the influences of the first period of the Hague School, the Barbizon School and the Impressionists.

In his paintings he cleverly uses his own visual language for the spatial extent and depth. His paintings live by the harmonious play of colors, sky, clouds, water and landscape. The lighting is living though the material interactions typical of the Netherlands seasons and climate.

From an art historical point of view he belongs to the Hague School, the School of Allebé, the Oosterbeek School, the Kortenhoef School and the Katwijk School. It must be seen as a Dutch art movement of that time of impressionism.

His works are characterized by their unique craft skills. His expressions were sketches on paper, and oil on wood and canvas.

He is buried at Zorgvlied cemetery.

Exhibition 

 1903 Stedelijke internationale tentoonstelling van kunstwerken van levende meesters, Stedelijk Museum, Amsterdam.
 1905 Collection of Arti et amicitiae and Pulchri Studio at Kunstverein in Hamburg
 1907 Stedelijke internationale tentoonstelling van kunstwerken van levende meesters, Stedelijk Museum, Amsterdam.
 1912 Stedelijke internationale tentoonstelling van kunstwerken van levende meesters, Stedelijk Museum, Amsterdam.

In possession of the Museums of the Netherlands a.s.f. 
 Historisches Museum, Amsterdam
 Rijksmuseum, Amsterdam
 Stedelijk Museum, Amsterdam
 Museum Willet-Holthuysen, Amsterdam
 Dordrechts Museum, Dordrecht
 Dienst Verspreide Rijkskollecties, The Hague
 Gemeentemuseum Den Haag, The Hague
 The Mesdag Collection, The Hague
 Stadhuis, The Hague
 Goois Museum, Hilversum
 Zeeuws Museum, Middelburg
 St. Vrienden Museum Noordwijk, Noordwijk
 Belasting museum, Rotterdam

A selection of pictures as a cross-section of his work
 Old-Amsterdam
 Market near the Noorderkerk, Amsterdam
 A view of Kolk, Amsterdam
 Old canal of Utrecht with view at the Dom
 A town square
 A view on a town canal by night
 Draw—bridge in winter landscape
 Windmills in winter
 Sawing mills
 Windmills in a polder landscape
 A farm along a River
 The forest at Oosterbeek
 In the dunes looking out to sea, Noordwijk aan Zee
 A street scene, Katwijk
 The church at Kortenhoef
 Landscape, Blaricum
 Pulling in the nets
 Waterlilies
 A river landscape
 Trees in a field
 Ducks in a forest fen
 Cows at pasture
 Wife with a pitch
 Flowers in a vase
 A summer's day at the beach
 Bomschuiten on the beach, Egmond aan Zee
 A shell fisher on the beach

Selected bibliography

Books
De Bodt, Saskia and Sellink, Manfred. Nineteenth Century Dutch Watercolors and Drawings, Museum Boijmans Van Beuningen, Rotterdam, 1998.
 Carole Denninger-Schreuder: De onvergankelijke kijk op Kortenhoef : een schilderdorp in beeld, uitgeverij Thoth Bussum, 1998, page 42 – 45.
 De Leeuw, Ronald et al. The Hague School Dutch Masters of the 19th Century (1983)
Sillevis, John, Dutch Drawings From the Age of Van Gogh, Taft Museum, Cincinnati, Ohio, 1992.
 John Sillevis: Katwijk in de schilderkunst, Katwijk Museum, Katwijk, 1995, .
Sillevis, John and Tabak, Anne, The Hague School Book, Waanders Uitgegevers, Zwolle, 2004.
 Suyver, Renske. A Reflection of Holland: The Best of the Hague School in the Rijksmuseum (2011)
 Wright, Christopher (1980): Paintings in Dutch Museums, Philip Wilson Publishers Ltd., London,

Publications
 B. Bakker et al.: De verzameling Van Eeghen, Amsterdamsche tekeningen 1600–1950, Zwolle /Amsterdam 1988, p. 438
 C.L. Dake: Aanteekeningen over beeldende kunst, Utrecht 1915, p. 75–76.
 H.M. Krabbé: J.H.Wijsmuller, Elsevier's Geïllustreerd Maandschrift 4 (1894), p. 233–247 en idem in: M.Rooses [red.], Het Schildersboek, [...], Dl 4, Amsterdam 1900, p. 179–195.
 J. Versteegh: Verandering tot die richting beteekent voor mij :zelfmoord – De kentering in de eerste tien jaren van Elsevier's Geïllustreerd Maandschrift, De Boekenwereld 20 (2003–2004), p. 151.

RDK – Netherlands
 Jonkman/Geudeker 2010, p. 52, 53
 Marius 1920, p. 229
 Scheen 1969–1970
 Scheen 1981, p. 597, afb.nr. 807 (als: Wijsmuller, Jan Hillebrand)
 Stolwijk 1998, p. 332
 Witt Checklist 1978

References

1855 births
1925 deaths
Dutch Impressionist painters
Painters from Amsterdam
19th-century Dutch painters
Dutch male painters
20th-century Dutch painters
Académie Royale des Beaux-Arts alumni
19th-century Dutch male artists
20th-century Dutch male artists